John Ernest Bode (13 February 1816 – 6 October 1874) was an Anglican priest, educator, poet, and hymnist.

Life

Born in London, he was the son of William Bode. Married with three children. Educated at Eton, the Charter House, and then at Christ Church, Oxford where he received his B.A. in 1837 and a M.A. He won the Hertford Scholarship. Ordained in 1841, he became Rector of Westwell, Oxfordshire in 1847, then of Castle Camps, Cambridgeshire, 1860. He was also for a time tutor of his college, and classical examiner. He died in Castle Camps, 6 October 1874 aged 58, and was buried near the hedge facing the West Window.

Published works
His Bampton Lectures were delivered in 1855.  He also published Ballads from Herodotus, Hymns from the Gospel of the Day for each Sunday and Festivals of our Lord; and Short Occasional Poems.   Hymns include O Jesus, I have promised, Sweetly the Sabbath Bell, God of Heaven enthroned in Might, and Spirit of Truth, Indwelling Light.

"O Jesus I Have Promised" was written on the occasion of the confirmation of his own two sons and daughter at Castle Camps in 1869. The hymn tune was written in 1881 by Arthur Henry Mann, who at one period in his life served as organist and choirmaster at King's College, Cambridge, famous for its superb choral music.

A letter written by him in support of Osborne Gordon is held in the Papers of Osborne Gordon collection at Oxford.

References

1816 births
1874 deaths
Anglican clergy from London
People educated at Eton College
People educated at Charterhouse School
Alumni of Christ Church, Oxford
19th-century English Anglican priests
Christian hymnwriters